Aykhan Ilkhamovich Guseynov (born 3 September 1999) is a Russian professional footballer who plays for Turan-Tovuz.

Club career
He made his debut in the Russian Professional Football League for FC Leningradets Leningrad Oblast on 6 April 2019 in a game against FC Znamya Truda Orekhovo-Zuyevo.

He made his Russian Football National League debut for FC Nizhny Novgorod on 14 September 2019 in a game against FC Luch Vladivostok.

References

External links
 Profile by Russian Professional Football League
 
 

1999 births
Living people
Russian footballers
Russian sportspeople of Azerbaijani descent
Association football midfielders
FC Nizhny Novgorod (2015) players
FC Ural Yekaterinburg players
FC Leningradets Leningrad Oblast players
FC Olimp-Dolgoprudny players